The 2006 AFF U-20 Youth Championship was held in Kuantan, Malaysia in September 2006.  Only four nations took part, three from the ASEAN region and associate member Australia. The tournament was played in a round-robin group with the winner of the group crowned champions.

Teams 
  Australia

Tournament 
All times are Malaysia Standard Time (MST) - UTC+8

Winner

Goalscorers 
3 goals
 Abdul Manaf Mamat

2 goals
 Nathan Burns
 Suttinun Phukhom

1 goal
 Dario Vidosic
 Bruce Djite
 James Downey
 Evan Berger
 Troy Hearfield
 Tarek Elrich
 Ahmad Fakri Saarani
 Nguyễn Văn Khải
 Nguyễn Quang Tình
 Huỳnh Phúc Hiệp

External links 
"AFF U-20 Youth Championship 2006" ASEAN Football Federation.

20 Youth Championship, 2006
AFF U-19 Youth Championship
2006
Aff
AFF
2006 in youth association football